The 1986–87 season of the European Cup Winners' Cup was won by Ajax in the final against Lokomotive Leipzig. The young Ajax side, which included the likes of Marco van Basten, Frank Rijkaard and Dennis Bergkamp, was guided to victory by its coach Johan Cruyff. It was Ajax's only title in the competition, and was added to a hat-trick of European Cup wins from 1971 to 1973. They also went on to win another European Cup and a UEFA Cup in the 1990s.

First round

|}

First leg

Second leg

2–2 on aggregate; Real Zaragoza won 4–3 on penalties.

Wrexham won 7–0 on aggregate.

Vitosha Sofia won 2–1 on aggregate.

Velež Mostar won 5–4 on aggregate.

17 Nëntori won 3–1 on aggregate.

Malmö FF won 7–2 on aggregate.

Ajax won 7–0 on aggregate.

Olympiacos won 6–0 on aggregate.

Benfica won 4–1 on aggregate.

Bordeaux won 6–1 on aggregate.

Torpedo Moscow won 5–3 on aggregate.

VfB Stuttgart won 1–0 on aggregate.

Rapid Wien won 7–6 on aggregate.

Lokomotive Leipzig won 3–1 on aggregate.

Katowice won 4–0 on aggregate.

Sion won 4–2 on aggregate.

Second round

|}

First leg

Second leg

2–2 on aggregate; Real Zaragoza won on away goals.

Vitosha Sofia won 5–4 on aggregate.

Malmö FF won 3–0 on aggregate.

Ajax won 5–1 on aggregate.

Bordeaux won 2–1 on aggregate.

Torpedo Moscow won 7–3 on aggregate.

Lokomotive Leipzig won 3–2 on aggregate.

Sion won 5–2 on aggregate.

Quarter-finals

|}

First leg

Second leg

Real Zaragoza won 4–0 on aggregate.

Ajax won 3–2 on aggregate.

3–3 on aggregate; Bordeaux won on away goals.

Lokomotive Leipzig won 2–0 on aggregate.

Semi-finals

|}

First leg

Second leg

Ajax won 6–2 on aggregate.

1–1 on aggregate; Lokomotive Leipzig won 6–5 on penalties.

Final

Top scorers

See also
 1986–87 European Cup
 1986–87 UEFA Cup

External links
 1986–87 competition at UEFA website
 Cup Winners' Cup results at Rec.Sport.Soccer Statistics Foundation
 Cup Winners Cup Seasons 1986–87 – results, protocols

3
UEFA Cup Winners' Cup seasons